Yaylı or Kavs is a village in the Artuklu District of Mardin Province in Turkey. The village is populated by Arabs of the Tat tribe and had a population of 1,799 in 2021.

References 

Villages in Artuklu District
Arab settlements in Mardin Province